C24 may refer to:

Vehicles 
Aircraft
 Caspar C 24, a German sport plane
 Castel C-24, a French training glider
 Cierva C.24, a British autogyro
 Douglas C-24, an American military transport
 Fairchild C-24, an American military transport
 IVL C.24, a Finnish fighter aircraft 

Automobiles
 Sauber C24, a Swiss Formula One car 

Ships
 , a C-class submarine of the Royal Navy
 , a Town-class cruiser of the Royal Navy

Other uses 
 C24 Gallery, an art gallery in New York City 
 C24 road (Namibia)
 Bishop's Opening, a chess opening
 Caldwell 24, a Seyfert galaxy
 Classical 24, an American syndicated radio service
 Gallbladder cancer
 Special Committee on Decolonization of the United Nations

See also
 List of compounds with carbon number 24